Herbert Lomas may refer to:

 Herbert Lomas (poet) (1924–2011), British poet and translator
 Herbert Lomas (actor) (1887–1961), British actor